Stanisław Czesław Trybuła (2 January 1932 – 28 January 2008) was a Polish mathematician and statistician.

He was a pupil of state high school in Rypin, Poland, and he graduated from The First High School in Toruń in 1950. He studied mathematics in Nicolaus Copernicus University in Toruń and Wrocław University. He defended his master thesis on some problems of the game theory prepared under supervision of Hugo Steinhaus at Wrocław University in 1955. In 1955 he became a faculty member at Department of Mathematics, Wrocław University of Technology. In 1959 he was distinguished as the candidate of science and in 1960 he defended his PhD on minimax estimation under supervision of Hugo Steinhaus. Many years Trybuła cooperated or was the staff member of Institute of Power Systems (IASE) in Wrocław. He worked out the original method of identification of the complex power systems. Since 1968 he was faculty member of the Institute of Mathematics, Faculty of Fundamental Problems of Technology, Wrocław University of Technology. Stanisław Trybuła got habilitation at Faculty of Mathematics, Physics and Chemistry, Wrocław University in 1968 based on his seminal works on sequential analysis for stochastic processes. He was the advisor of 14 PhD theses. He took early retirement in 1998 and was writing academic books on statistics and the game theory.

Stanisław Trybuła is the co-author of the WJ bidding system in the bridge, known also as Polish Club (see also Trybula transfers, Wesolowski texas, Gawrys fourth suit forcing).

References

Nicolaus Copernicus University in Toruń alumni
1932 births
2008 deaths
Polish mathematicians
Polish statisticians
Probability theorists